The Arrows A1 was the car with which Arrows Grand Prix International competed in the  and  Formula One seasons. It replaced the Arrows FA1, which was banned by the London High Court on 31 July 1978 after a legal protest from the Shadow team on the grounds that it was a carbon-copy of the Shadow DN9. Arrows anticipated that they would lose against Shadow and designed and built the A1 in under 60 days whilst the court case was being heard. Hence Arrows were able to present the Arrows A1 to the press just three days after the court case ended and did not miss any races.

Given that the FA1 was a carbon-copy of the Shadow DN9, the A1 is the essentially first true F1 car designed and built by Arrows Grand Prix International.

The Arrows A1 was one of the first "ground effects" Formula 1 cars and despite being rushed into service without any testing or development after the FA1 was banned, the Arrows A1 proved competitive. Riccardo Patrese finished 4th in the 1978 Canadian GP. A number of further 4th and 5th places followed in 1979 and that year's Monaco GP could have been the Arrows A1 crowning-glory, with Jochen Mass running as high as third in the race (after qualifying eighth) before brake issues dropped him down to sixth at the chequered flag.

In total six Arrows A1 were built, chassis numbers A1-01 to A1-06.

The first three cars (chassis A1-01, A1-02, and A1-03) were used in 1978 and were all built to the same "initial" 1978 specification. For the first race of 1979 (the Argentine GP) three cars (in effect two race-ready cars and a spare monocoque) had been prepared to an updated specification, known as A1-B specification. The two race cars were chassis A1-03 (which had been updated) and the new chassis A1-05, whilst the spare monocoque was new chassis A1-04. During the Argentine GP warm-up A1-05 was crashed and this chassis was subsequently rebuilt to a further improved A1-C specification alongside the final Arrows A1 chassis built, A1-06. Both A1-05 and A1-06 debuted at the 1979 South African GP and were used by Riccardo Patrese (A1-06) and Jochen Mass (A1-05) till the radical, but unsuccessful, Arrows A2 was introduced. In fact, even after the Arrows A2 had been introduced, Riccardo Patrese chose at times to practice in and race the older Arrows A1 believing it to be a superior car, with more predictable handling.

The A1-B update included stiffening the monocoque and revising the "ground-effects" side-pods. The A1-C update included a new rear wing with a single central support, improved rear-suspension geometry and totally re-designed "ground-effects" side-pods which were more swept-up towards the rear tyre.

As the updated A1-C specification cars (A1-05 and A1-06) were introduced, three older specification Arrows A1's (A1-02, A1-03 and A1-04) were sold to Charles Clowes Racing and A1-01 was put on display in a museum. Charles Clowes Racing competed in the 1979 and 1980 Aurora AFX British Formula One Championships with his three A1's. Rupert Keegan won the championship in 1979 in a Clowes-run Arrows A1 and Guy Edwards finished a very close 3rd in the 1980 season in one of Clowes' Arrows A1 behind two Williams FW07's.

Formula One entries

Complete Formula One World Championship results
(key) 

* 8 points in  scored using the FA1* 2 points in  scored using the A2

References

A01